Jhonny Jose Pérez Pena (born 16 September 1997) is a Dominican competitive swimmer. He competed at the 2016 Summer Olympics in Rio de Janeiro, in the men's 100 metre freestyle. Also competed at the 2015 World Aquatics Championships, 2016 FINA World Swimming Championships (25 m), and 2018 FINA World Swimming Championships (25 m).

References

External links

1997 births
Living people
Dominican Republic male swimmers
Olympic swimmers of the Dominican Republic
Swimmers at the 2016 Summer Olympics